Lycée français de Düsseldorf is a French international school in Düsseldorf. It serves maternelle (preschool) through lycée (senior high school) levels.

See also
 La Gazette de Berlin
German international schools in France:
 Internationale Deutsche Schule Paris
 DFG / LFA Buc
 Deutsche Schule Toulouse

References

External links
  Lycée français de Düsseldorf

French international schools in Germany
International schools in North Rhine–Westphalia
Schools in Düsseldorf